Caladenia multiclavia, commonly known as the lazy spider orchid is a species of orchid, endemic to the south-west of Western Australia. It has a single, hairy leaf and one or two greenish-yellow, red and cream-coloured flowers resembling a reclining spider. Although it usually only has a single flower, it often grows in clumps of up to six plants.

Description
The flowers are greenish-yellow, red and cream-coloured, shaped like a reclining spider and the sepals and petals have thin, thread-like tips. The dorsal sepal and petals are close together and parallel, curved down behind the column near their bases, then upswept at the back of the flower. The lateral sepals are similarly arranged but at the front of the flower. Flowering occurs from September to October.

Taxonomy and naming
Caladenia multiclavia was first described in 1871 by Heinrich Reichenbach and the description was published in Beitrage zur Systematischen Pflanzenkunde. The specific epithet (multiclavia) is derived from the Latin words multus meaning "much" or "many" and clava meaning "club", referring to the many calli on the labellum of this species.

Distribution and habitat
The lazy spider orchid occurs in a band between Wongan Hills and Ravensthorpe in the Avon Wheatbelt, Esperance Plains and Mallee biogeographic regions where it grows in she-oak thickets and open woodland.

Conservation
Caladenia multiclavia is classified as "not threatened" by the Western Australian Government Department of Parks and Wildlife.

References

multiclavia
Orchids of Western Australia
Endemic orchids of Australia
Plants described in 1871
Endemic flora of Western Australia